Fear and Loathing at Rolling Stone: The Essential Writings of Hunter S. Thompson is a 2009 book that collects "the finest work" by Hunter S. Thompson during his 40-year stint at Rolling Stone. The book was edited by Jann S. Wenner, co-founder and publisher of Rolling Stone.

References 

Essay collections by Hunter S. Thompson
2009 non-fiction books
Little, Brown and Company books